Monkey chanting or monkey chants are chants or calls aimed at ridiculing or denigrating Black sportspeople, usually footballers, who play in majority-White countries. The chants are intended to imitate "monkey" or "ape" noises. They may be accompanied by "monkey gestures", in imitation of the scratching of the armpits commonly seen amongst ape species. The chants are expressive of the ethnic slurs "macaca" and "monkey" against people of African heritage.

Monkey chants may also be accompanied by throwing so-called "monkey food" (peanuts, bananas or banana skins) at black players or onto the sports field.

A number of incidents of this kind have been noted by media as manifestations of racism in association football and racism in cricket.

See also 
List of 2018 FIFA World Cup controversies

References 

Anti-African and anti-black slurs
Racism in sport
Football songs and chants
Apes in popular culture
Monkeys in popular culture